Taraz Airport , also known as Jambyl Airport is an airport serving Taraz (formerly Jambyl and Aulie-Ata), a city in the Jambyl Province of Kazakhstan.

Airlines and destinations

References

External links
 
 

Airports in Kazakhstan